The 2015 European 10,000m Cup, was the 19th edition of the European 10,000m Cup took place on 6 June in Cagliari, Italia.

Results 
In italic the participants whose result did not go into the team's total time, but awarded with medals.

Men

Women

References

External links
 EAA web site

European 10,000m Cup
European Cup 10,000m